Raimondo Montecuccoli has been the name of at least two ships of the Italian Navy, named in honour of Raimondo Montecuccoli:
 , a  launched in 1934 and stricken in 1964
 , a  launched in 2020

Italian Navy ship names